Patricio Álvarez (born Lima, Peru, 24 January 1994) is a professional footballer who plays as a goalkeeper for Sport Boys.

Nicknamed 'Pato', Alvarez was at Club Universitario de Deportes from 2012 to 2014 before joining FBC Melgar with whom in 2015 Alvarez won the Peruvian Primera División. In December 2017 Alvarez signed a 3 year contract with Sporting Cristal, joining from Melgar.

On the 28 September 2018 Alvarez was called up to the Peru national football team for the matches against the USA and Chile.

References

1994 births
Living people
People from Lima
Peruvian footballers
Club Universitario de Deportes footballers
FBC Melgar footballers
Sporting Cristal footballers
Association football goalkeepers
2019 Copa América players